Johan Simonsen (February 19, 1917 – October 10, 1980) was a Faroese fisherman and politician for the Republic party.

Simonsen was born in Tjørnuvík. He served as a board member of Klaksvík Hospital and the Faroese Fishing Association for many years. Simonsen was elected to the Faroese Parliament as a representative from the Norðoyar district, serving from 1954 to 1966. He also served as a deputy for Finnbogi Ísakson from 1975 to 1978.

References

Further reading
 Dahl, Árni. 2002. Løgtingið 150. Hátíðarrit. Vol. 2. Tórshavn, p. 348.

Members of the Løgting
1917 births
1980 deaths